Tiffany Joy McGhee (born April 7, 1986), who goes by the stage name Tiff Joy, is an American urban contemporary gospel artist and musician. She started her music career, in 2014, by performing on an album by Ricky Dillard. Her first studio album, TIFF JOY, was released on September 25, 2015 by WalkWay Music Group, VMan Entertainment, and Tyscot Records. This album was her breakthrough release upon the Billboard magazine charts.

Early life
Tiff Joy was born, Tiffany Joy McGhee, on April 7, 1986, the daughter of Pastors Timothy and Bernadine Bell-McGhee of the Free Spirit Ministerial Worship Center congregation in Chicago, Illinois, where she was raised.

Music career
Her music career started in 2014, with the appearance on Ricky Dillard's live album, Amazing, on the song, "Amazing", which won a Stellar Award. She released, TIFF JOY, a studio album, on September 25, 2015, with WalkWay Music Group, VMan Entertainment, and Tyscot Records. This album was her breakthrough release upon the Billboard magazine Gospel Albums chart, where it peaked at No. 5. The song, "The Promise", has peaked on the Gospel Airplay chart at No. 26.

Discography

Studio albums

References

External links
Official website
Tyscot Records profile

1986 births
Living people
African-American songwriters
African-American Christians
Musicians from Chicago
Songwriters from Illinois
21st-century African-American people
20th-century African-American people